This is a list of accidental explosions and facts about each one, grouped by the time of their occurrence. It does not include explosions caused by terrorist attacks or arson, as well as intentional explosions for civil or military purposes. It may still include entries for which the cause is unclear or still under investigation. For a list based on power or death toll see largest artificial non-nuclear explosions or the explosions section of list of accidents and disasters by death toll. This list also contains notable explosions that would not qualify for the articles mentioned above and is more detailed, especially for the latest centuries.

Prior to 2000

2000s

2010s

2020s

See also
 List of pipeline accidents
 List of ammonium nitrate disasters
 List of accidents and incidents involving transport or storage of ammunition

References

+
Explosions